Hickory is a type of tree (Carya species) found in North America and East Asia.

Hickory may also refer to:

Places in the United States
 Hickory, Alabama, a place in Pickens County
 Hickory, Kentucky, a census-designated place
 Hickory, Louisiana, a place in St. Tammany Parish, Louisiana
 Hickory, Maryland, an unincorporated community
 Hickory, Mississippi, a town
 Hickory County, Missouri
 Hickory, North Carolina, a city
 Hickory Motor Speedway
 Hickory, Oklahoma, a town
 Hickory, Pennsylvania, a census-designated place
 Hickory, Tennessee, a place in Sevier County, Tennessee
 Hickory, Virginia, an unincorporated community
 Hickory Creek (disambiguation)
 Hickory Mountain (disambiguation)
 Hickory Township (disambiguation)

Other uses 
 Hickory High School (disambiguation)
 , a United States Coast Guard seagoing buoy tender
 Hickory, childhood nickname of Mose Solomon (1900–1966), Major League Baseball player
 Hickory Records, a record label
 Hickory, a character played by Jack Haley in the 1939 film The Wizard of Oz
 Foxcliffe Hickory Wind or Hickory, a dog named Best in Show at the Westminster Kennel Club Dog Show in 2011
 Hickory cloth, a cotton twill used for North American workshirts and coveralls
 Hickory golf, a form of golf played with hickory-shafted golf clubs
 "Hickory", a song by Iron & Wine from the album Around the Well
 Hickory, an early name for Phil Collins's band Flaming Youth

See also 
 Old Hickory (disambiguation)
 
 
 The Hickories, Cazenovia, New York, a house on the US National Register of Historic Places